Les Salelles is a commune in the Lozère department in the region Occitanie in southern France. Its inhabitants are called Les Salellois.

Geography
Les Salelles is on the left bank of river Lot, near the commune of Chanac.

History
In , an exceptional flooding of the river Lot destroyed part of the bridge and the road. The bridge was repaired.

Population

Religious buildings
 Church from the 14th century

Events
 Town fair on 15 August
 Bread fair in Autumn

See also
Communes of the Lozère department

References

External links 
 Official site of the commune des Salelles (French)

Salelles